Universe 17 is an anthology of original science fiction short stories edited by Terry Carr, the last volume in the seventeen-volume Universe anthology series (though the series was rebooted a few years later). It was first published in hardcover by Doubleday in June 1987.

The book collects six novelettes and short stories by various science fiction authors.

Contents
 "Second Going" (James Tiptree, Jr.)
 "Mencken Stuff" (Joel Richards)
 "Lapidary Nights" (Marta Randall)
 "The Man Who Watched the Glaciers Run" (Cherie Wilkerson)
 "Pliny's Commentaries" (Ned Huston)
 "In the Tower" (Jack McDevitt)

Awards
The anthology placed fourth in the 1988 Locus Poll Award for Best Anthology.

"Second Going" placed twenty-third in the 1988 Locus Poll Award for Best Novelette.

"Lapidary Nights" placed twenty-fourth in the 1988 Locus Poll Award for Best Short Story.

References

1987 anthologies
Universe (anthology series)
Doubleday (publisher) books